Théodore Mel Eg (10 July 1952 – 11 July 2019) was an Ivorian politician who served as Minister of Culture and Francophonie.

References

1952 births
2019 deaths
Government ministers of Ivory Coast